Arthur Brookfield (1870 – 1930) was an English footballer who played in the Football League for Stoke.

Career
Brookfield was born in Stoke-upon-Trent and played for Longton Atlas before joining Stoke in 1894. He played eight matches for Stoke during the 1894–95 season scoring twice against Bolton Wanderers. He managed just two appearances in 1895–96 and left for Crewe Alexandra.

Career statistics

References

English footballers
Stoke City F.C. players
Crewe Alexandra F.C. players
English Football League players
1870 births
1930 deaths
Association football outside forwards